Walter William Becker is an American filmmaker and novelist, whose directorial credits include the films Van Wilder, Wild Hogs, and Old Dogs.

Early life and education
Becker was born in Hollywood, California and graduated from Pasadena High School (California) in 1986 and USC School of Cinema-Television in 1995, where he was a member of the Lambda Chi Alpha fraternity. 

He also wrote the novel Link in 1999, which was on the Los Angeles Times{'} bestseller list for four weeks. It is based on some theories of Graham Hancock, to whom he refers in the epilogue. He has a son and a daughter with his wife, Lindsay.

In January 2010, TBS picked up Glory Daze, a fraternity-centered comedy pilot set in the 1980s created and written by Becker and Michael LeSieur, to also be directed by Becker.

In January 2016, Becker is said to be working with Rome co-creator William J. Macdonald on a pilot for Storyville, which is based on the bestselling book Empire of Sin by Gary Krist.

In September 2017, Becker was hired to direct the new Clifford the Big Red Dog movie, replacing David Bowers. The film was released on November 10, 2021. Due to the COVID-19 pandemic, the film received a hybrid release in theaters and on the Paramount+ streaming service. Shortly after the film's release, it was announced that a sequel was in development.

Filmography

Film

Television

Producer
 Glory Days (2010) (3 episodes)
 Zookeeper (2011)
 Thunderballs (2011) (Television film)
 Bad Samaritans (2013) (2 episodes)
 Do It Yourself (2014) (Television film)

Bibliography

References

External links
 

Male actors from California
American male screenwriters
American male film actors
Pasadena High School (California) alumni
USC School of Cinematic Arts alumni
1968 births
Living people
Film directors from California
Film producers from California
Screenwriters from California